This article is about the demographic features of the population of Samoa, including population density, ethnicity, education level, health of the populace, economic status, religious affiliations and other aspects of the population.

Vital statistics

UN estimates

The Population Department of the United Nations prepared the following estimates. Population estimates account for under numeration in population censuses.

Births and deaths

Fertility Rate (The Demographic Health Survey)

Fertility Rate (TFR) (Wanted Fertility Rate) and CBR (Crude Birth Rate):

CIA World Factbook demographic statistics

The following demographic statistics are from the CIA World Factbook, unless otherwise indicated.

Total population
 195,864

Age structure
0–14 years: 32.72% (male 33,393/female 31,324)
15–24 years: 19.96% (male 20,253/female 19,217)
25–54 years: 35.58% (male 36,374/female 33,993)
55–64 years: 6.24% (male 6,283/female 6,057)
65 years and over: 5.5% (male 4,730/female 6,149) (2015 est.)

Median age
Total: 23.5 years
Male: 23.3 years
Female: 23.8 years (2015 est.)

Population growth rate
 0.58%

Birth rate
20.87 births/1,000 population

Death rate
5.32 deaths/1,000 population

Net migration rate
-9.78 migrant(s)/1,000 population (2015 est.)

Sex ratio
At Birth: 1.05 male(s)/female
0–14 years: 1.07 male(s)/female
15–24 years: 1.05 male(s)/female
25–54 years: 1.07 male(s)/female
55–64 years: 1.04 male(s)/female
65 years and over: 0.77 male(s)/female
Total population: 1.04 male(s)/female (2015 est.)

Infant mortality rate
Total: 19.57 deaths/1,000 live births
Male: 23.1 deaths/1,000 live births
Female: 15.87 deaths/1,000 live births

Death rate
5.32 deaths/1,000 population

Life expectancy at birth
Total population: 73.46 years
Male: 70.58 years
Female: 76.48 years

Total fertility rate
2.84 children born/woman (2015 est.)

Nationality
Samoans (Noun)
Samoan (Adjective)

Ethnic groups
Samoan 96%
Dual Samoan-New Zealander 2%
Other 1.9%

Religions

Protestant 57.4% 
Congregationalist 31.8%
Methodist 13.7%
Assembly of God 8%, 
Seventh-Day Adventist 3.9%
Roman Catholic 19.4%
Mormon 15.2%
Worship Centre 1.7%
Other Christian 5.5%
Other 0.7%
None 0.1%, 
Unspecified 0.1%

Languages
Samoan (Official)
English

Literacy
Total Population: 99%
Male: 99.1%
Female: 98.8%

References

External links